Tricypha is a genus of moths in the family Erebidae. The genus was erected by Möschler in 1878.

Species
Tricypha furcata Möschler, 1878
Tricypha imperialis (Heylaerts, 1884)
Tricypha mathani (Rothschild, 1909)
Tricypha nigrescens Rothschild, 1909
Tricypha obscura (Hampson, 1898)
Tricypha ochrea (Hampson, 1901)
Tricypha popayana Dognin, 1923
Tricypha proxima (Grote, 1867)
Tricypha pseudotricypha (Rothschild, 1909)
Tricypha rosenbergi (Rothschild, 1910)

References

Phaegopterina
Moth genera